Havre Seamount is an active volcanic seamount lying within the Kermadec Islands group of New Zealand, in the south-west Pacific Ocean, on the Tonga-Kermadec Ridge. Its most recent eruption took place in July 2012.

See also
Monowai (seamount)

References

Active volcanoes
Seamounts of New Zealand
Geography of the Kermadec Islands
Volcanoes of New Zealand